Lega Giovani, formally known as Movimento Giovani Padani (MGP), is the youth wing of the League, a right-wing political party in Italy. Its current Chairperson is Luca Toccalini.

Originally launched with a different name in 1991, the MGP was established in all the regions of northern Italy, called "Padania" by the League members, in 1996. Massimiliano Romeo, leader of the MGP in Lombardy since 1994, was the first federal coordinator.

The current leaders of Lega Nord and Lega Lombarda, Matteo Salvini and Paolo Grimoldi, were previously leaders of the MGP. The Movement, which staunchly supports Salvini, is seen by some in the party as a "faction" and, as such, some party bigwigs (including people close to Roberto Maroni and Roberto Calderoli) have proposed to disband it.

Leadership
Federal coordinator: Massimiliano Romeo (1996–1997), Max Loda (1997), Matteo Salvini (1998–2002), Paolo Grimoldi (2002–2011), Lucio Brignoli (2011–2013), Matteo Mognaschi (2013–2015), Andrea Crippa (2015–2019), Luca Toccalini (2019-present).

References

External links
 Official Website

1991 establishments in Italy
Youth wings of political parties in Italy
Lega Nord
Youth organizations established in 1991